The Alto Independent School District is a school district based in Alto, Texas, USA.  It is managed by a six-person Board of Trustees. The superintendent is Kelly West. The district is also served by Angelina College, a community college located in Lufkin, Texas.

Finances
As of the 2010-2011 school year, the appraised valuation of property, in the district, was $145,267,000. The maintenance tax rate was $0.104 and the bond tax rate was $0.027 per $100 of appraised valuation.

Academic achievement
In 2011, the school district was rated "academically acceptable" by the Texas Education Agency.  Forty-nine percent of districts in Texas in 2011 received the same rating. No state accountability ratings will be given to districts in 2012. A school district in Texas can receive one of four possible rankings from the Texas Education Agency: Exemplary (the highest possible ranking), Recognized, Academically Acceptable, and Academically Unacceptable (the lowest possible ranking).

Historical district TEA accountability ratings
2011: Academically Acceptable
2010: Academically Acceptable
2009: Academically Acceptable
2008: Academically Acceptable
2007: Academically Acceptable
2006: Academically Acceptable
2005: Academically Acceptable
2004: Academically Acceptable

Schools
In the 2011-2012 school year, the district operated three schools.
 Alto High School, Grades 9-12, principal Shanequa Redd-Dorsey
 Alto Middle School, Grades 5-8, principal Brandi Tiner 
In the 2011-2012 school year the principal was Kelly West and the enrollment was 216 students. The school colors are black and gold and the school mascot is the yellowjacket. In 2011, the school was rated "academically acceptable" by the Texas Education Agency. Since West took over they have been listed as one of the best 150 Middle schools in Texas by Texas Monthly Magazine.
 Alto Elementary School, Grades PK-4, principal Candis Mabry

Special programs

Athletics
Alto High School participates in the boys sports of baseball, basketball, football, and wrestling. The school participates in the girls sports of basketball and softball. For the 2012 through 2014 school years, Alto High School will play football in UIL Class 1A Division I.

See also

List of school districts in Texas
List of high schools in Texas

References

External links
 Official site

School districts in Cherokee County, Texas